Tirat Valley is located in Swat, North-West Frontier Province, Pakistan.

Tirat is located at about 3 kilometers from Madyan (a hill station), which is connected by roads at Ranzra bridge. As a whole, Tirat is the name of a complete Union Council, but the specific village Tirat is the heart of the upper Swat. Tirat village can be recognised by the great minar of the Jamia Masjid. 

Swat District
Valleys of Khyber Pakhtunkhwa
Populated places in Swat District